Luciano Emmer (19 January 1918 – 16 September 2009) was an Italian film director. He was born in Milan, but most of his childhood lived in Venice. 

He started as filmmaker at filming Giotto's frescoes in Padua in 1938. Screenwriter Sergio Amidei, found the finance for Emmer to make a feature about Romans spending a Sunday in August on the beach at Ostia. He won a Golden Globe in 1951 for Pictura: An Adventure in Art. He has directed more documentaries than fiction pictures, most notably Domenica d'agosto and the romance-comedy-drama Three Girls from Rome.

Luciano Emmer started his career as a filmmaker working with Enrico Gras. He founded the production company Dolomiti Film and directed several documentaries. In 1949, Emmer produced his first feature film Dimanche d'August (1950) with Marcello Mastroianni. Also with Mastroianni, the following year he made Paris is always Paris (1951).

In the 1950s, Luciano Emmer made advertising films meanwhile he continued with his documentary work. He was labeled as an example of the Italian pink neorealism. In 1956, Emmer directed with Robert Enrico To Each His Own Paradise. After The Girl in the Window (1961), a social drama with Marina Vlady and Lino Ventura, he turned to television. He made his return to the cinema with Enough! I make a movie.

Luciano Emmer was the father of mathematician, writer and director Michele Emmer and of the director David Emmer.

Selected filmography
1938 Racconto di un affresco  (documentary)
1940 Il Paradiso terrestre  (documentary)
1940 I disastri della guerra  (documentary)
1949 Sunday in August
1951 Paris Is Always Paris
1951 Pictura: An Adventure in Art (co-director)
1952 Three Girls from Rome Le ragazze di Piazza di Spagna
1954 Incontrare Picasso (documentary)
1954 High School
1954 Gli eroi dell'Artide (documentary)
1954 Camilla
1955 Picasso
1955 Il bigamo
1957 Paradiso terrestre (documentary)
1957 Il momento più bello
1961  Girl in the Window 
1972 Cesare Zavattini e il "Campo di grano con corvi" di Van Gogh (documentary)
1990 Basta! Ci faccio un film
2001 Una lunga, lunga, lunga notte d'amore
2003 L'acqua... il fuoco

References

External links
 

1918 births
2009 deaths
Italian film directors
20th-century Italian screenwriters
Film people from Milan
Italian male screenwriters
20th-century Italian male writers